T2, officially registered as Tea Too, is a chain of specialty tea shops with stores in Australia, the United Kingdom, the United States, Singapore, and New Zealand. The company was established in Melbourne, Australia in 1996, and was purchased by Unilever in 2013.

History 
T2 was co-founded by Maryanne Shearer and Jan O'Connor. In 1995, they originally registered a homewares company, 'Contents Homeware'. They changed their focus after identifying a gap in the tea shop market, and chose the name 'Tea two' to denote the two co-founders, but written as 'Tea too'. The business has been credited as paving the way for the tea revival, and transforming the tea industry in Australia by educating consumers and championing different flavours and types of tea.

Ownership

Startup 
In 1996, Jan O'Connor and Maryanne Shearer each put in $50,000 to start the company as equal co-founders.

In 'T2: the book', Maryanne Shearer noted that her business relationship with O'Connor deteriorated when she returned to work in March 2000 after having her first child. As relations continued to be strained, an acrimonious legal battle ensued forcing O'Connor to leave the business. Bruce Crome, Shearer's partner, purchased O'Connor's share in the business at the end of October 2001.

Investment partnership 
In 2007, Maryanne Shearer and partner Bruce Crome sold 50 per cent of T2 to retail investors Jonathan Dan and Phillip Blanco. After disagreements about growth strategies, Shearer and Crome bought 25 per cent back from Blanco, but Dan continued his investment.

Acquisition by Unilever 
Multinational company Unilever acquired T2 from Maryanne Shearer and Bruce Crome in October 2013. As of 2015, Shearer was T2's Creative Director. In announcing the acquisition, Shearer highlighted Unilever's leading role in adopting sustainable agriculture practices for the tea industry as being a good values fit for T2.  T2 had worked with Fairtrade since 2009 on the English breakfast tea blend. The Sydney Morning Herald noted that restaurant owner Michael Ryan reacted to the acquisition news with a tweet describing the company as "Unilever's Teas'r'Us". In 2017, writer Jayne D'Arcy used the term "Unilever-ed", to describe the company's shift from being locally Melbourne-owned.

The purchase price was estimated to be less than $100 million, and was later disclosed as $60 million. Legal services for T2 were provided by Baker & McKenzie and Harris Carlson, with financial advice from Deloitte. Legal services for Unilever were provided by Johnson Winter & Slattery, with financial advice from KPMG.

Outlets and turnover

Stores 
On 1 July 1996, the first store was opened at 340 Brunswick Street, Fitzroy. A second store was opened on Fitzroy Street, St Kilda, but it was closed after 12 months due to low patronage. However, the following year sales increased 20% which fuelled a vision to expand into Sydney.

In November 1999, a store was opened in Chadstone Shopping Centre, Australia's premier shopping centre. The store was immediately a success, helping to increase T2's revenue beyond $1 million.

In 2002, T2 expanded to Sydney with a store in King Street, Newtown. In 2004, there were six stores in the chain, and by 2005 there were eight stores, fifty-five team members and a turnover of $4.4 million. In 2006 the turnover was $8 million. In 2008, they moved their operations from Fitzroy to a leased office in the Port Melbourne area. In August 2012, they leased a warehouse at 50 Cyanamid Street in Laverton North. In September 2012, T2 leased a building at 35 Wellington Street in Collingwood, with the intention of relocating the head office to that location.

In March 2012, Shearer declared that T2 were "being brave" in the difficult retail climate by continuing to expand their number of stores. In September 2012, the first Tasmanian T2 store was opened in the Cat & Fiddle Arcade, Hobart.

In May 2013, a T2 shop was opened at 269 Little Collins Street, Melbourne, after it was vacated by designer Bettina Liano due to rental costs. That same year, T2 opened a store in Cairns Central.

In 2014, 18 new stores were opened. Three of the stores opened in London (including on Shoreditch High Street) and one in New York City. A year later, a fourth London store was opened at 290 Regent Street, in the West End.

In 2015, there were over seventy stores in four countries, and around 1,000 team members.

In 2017, the first T2 stores were opened in Scotland (131 Buchanan Street, Glasgow), and in Singapore (the first outlet in Asia). As of November 2017, there are over 96 stores across Australia, New Zealand, the United States and Asia.

In 2023, T2 announced that due to "unprecedented changes" of the past few years, they have decided to "close all operations in the Northern Hemisphere to focus on regions closer to home, such as Australia, New Zealand and Singapore". T2's US stores will be closing on the 19th of February 2023, with their US websites trading until the 22nd of February 2023 (with the exception of their Valley Fair location in California, which will remain open until the 25th of June 2023).

Wholesale 
Towards the end of 1996, O'Connor developed a custom tea blend for Geoff Lindsay's restaurant Stella. The T2 'Stella' blend was mentioned on the menu, which created a lot of interest from diners. After realising there was a huge opportunity supplying tea to restaurants, an untapped market, O'Connor created a wholesale division for T2.

From mid-2000’s, T2 was supplying 300 cafes and restaurants in multiple states of Australia. By September that year, the number had increased to 400 with a few international accounts. By mid-2001, the number of wholesale accounts had grown to approximately 500. In 2015, there were 3000 wholesale accounts.

Currently, in the T2 Distribution Centre located in Laverton North, Victoria.

Branding 
The store design is focused on enjoyment in the rituals of tea-making, and has been described as "...a modern version of an old wares store-cum-apothecary...". The first store had a pink-painted ceiling and Chinese newspapers as wallpaper. The stores' interior design is dark and moody, with orange and black as signature colours. T2's signature orange has been analysed as having vibrancy to appeal to a younger market while retaining simplicity for older tastes, and to imply the colour of brewing tea without being murky or brown. The sensory experience includes tea tastings and "smelling table" product displays of the tea ingredients. The design of the first T2 store in Scotland offered a tea "fountain" constructed from teaware. The ambience of the T2 stores inspired Sunshine Coast author Josephine Moon's debut 2014 novel The Tea Chest.

Tea blends 

T2's wide range of blends has been considered reflective of Australians' growing interest in boutique teas. The number of blends or varieties have been variously reported as "at least 250" in 2003, "over 200" in 2005, "about 180" in 2006, "250-plus" in 2015, and in 2017, one of their UK stores had over 130 types of tea.

Chai became popular in 2006, and continued to be one of the three top-selling teas for T2 in 2010.

Until 2007, all T2 teas were sold as loose leaf, but at the demand of restaurants, they then introduced tea bags made of sheer muslin cloth in a pyramid shape. The tea bags were produced with a purpose-built imported machine.

In March 2009, in response to the growing popularity of Chinese classic teas, the Perth T2 store launched black tea pu-er in cake form, where previously it had only been selling it as a loose leaf variety.

T2 has a special black tea blend with vanilla for their Melbourne home-city, Melbourne Breakfast Tea, as well as other cities: Brisbane Breakfast with mango, Sydney Breakfast, and Perth Breakfast. In May 2013, T2 created Hobart Breakfast tea.

The Melbourne Breakfast Tea and Liquorice Legs were initially the best-selling blends in the Shoreditch London store in 2014, with later top sellers being London Breakfast and Earl Grey Royale. Flush Darjeeling was so popular as to merit a waiting list.

In 2016 they introduced the Veggie Patch limited edition loose tea range.

A limited edition collection of chai teas was released in 2017, with blends tasting of popcorn, sticky honey, or honeycomb chai.

In line with the first store opening in Singapore, in 2017 T2 created Singapore Breakfast tea, evoking kaya toast with a blend of pu'er, green tea, coconut flakes and roasted rice.

Awards 
Co-founder Maryanne Shearer received the Veuve Clicquot Business Woman of the Year award in 2012.

The Shoreditch, London store was designed by Australian-based Landini Associates. It won the Store of the Year in the Retail Design Institute's 2014 International Design Competition. Landini Associates also redesigned T2's corporate headquarters in Collingwood, which was a Silver Winner in the Interior Design - Corporate Category in the 2014 Melbourne Design Awards.

In 2015, Christopher Stanko's T2 Tea Cotton Teabags designs ranked as a finalist in the Australian Packaging Design Awards (Beverage category).

In December 2016, Metsä Board's packaging design for T2's mini fruit tea range won a Merit Award at the 28th Hong Kong Print Awards (Paper Packaging category). The design also won the Limited Edition category in The Dieline Awards 2017. In the same year, they won an IF Design Award (Beverages Packaging category).

Book Writer 
In 2015, Shearer published T2: the book, which discussed the company's history, profiled different types of tea and recommended tea cups and brewing techniques. In February 2016, Kristen Droesch's book review in Library Journal highlighted the unique, artistic details of the design, and considered it to be "...more than just an advertisement for T2.".

The book was designed by Evi O and was a category winner for the Australian Book Designers Association's Best Designed Fully-illustrated Book under $50 in 2016.

See also

Tea in Australia
List of tea companies

References

External links 
 

Australian companies established in 1996
Food and drink companies established in 1996
Australian subsidiaries of foreign companies
Tea companies of Australia
Ekaterra
Former Unilever brands
2013 mergers and acquisitions
Certified B Corporations in the Food & Beverage Industry
B Lab-certified corporations in Australia